Muhi Ram Saikia (15 April 1923 – 1 February 2007) was an Indian politician. He was elected to the Lok Sabha, lower house of the Parliament of India from the Nowgong, Assam in 1991, 1996 and 1998 as a member of the Asom Gana Parishad. He was the Union Minister of State for Human Resources Development in the United Front governments headed by H. D. Deve Gowda and Inder Kumar Gujral. Prior to joining politics, he was an educator and served as the principal of Nowgong College for fifteen years. Saikia died in February 2007.

References

External links
 Official biographical sketch in Parliament of India website

1923 births
2007 deaths
India MPs 1991–1996
India MPs 1996–1997
India MPs 1984–1989
Assam politicians
Lok Sabha members from Assam
Asom Gana Parishad politicians